Masindi Port is a town in the  Western Region of Uganda. The name also applied to the sub-county, where the own sits and forms the sub-county headquarters.

Location

The geographical coordinates of Masindi Port are 1°41'54.0"N, 32°04'40.0"E (Latitude:1.6983;, 32.0778).

Overview
Masindi Port was a busy river boat docking station during the late 19th and early 20th centuries. Steamboats were a major mode of transport on the Nile River. Because of the Karuma Falls and the Murchison Falls on the Victoria Nile between Lake Kyoga and Lake Albert, steamboats could not navigate that part of the Nile. Passengers would travel by boat from Lake Victoria, down the Victoria Nile into Lake Kyoga. They would then disembark at Masindi Port and travel by land to Butiaba, a port on Lake Albert, where they would resume their water journey downstream the Nile. With the decline of this mode of river transportation, Masindi Port and Butiaba have been reduced to mainly market towns.

Population
In 2009, the Uganda Bureau of Statistics (UBOS) estimated the population of Masindi Port at about 10,400.

In 2015, UBOS estimated the town's population at 9,100 people. In 2020, the population agency estimated the mid-year population of Masindi Port at 10,400. Of these, 5,500 (52.9 percent) were males and 4,900 (47.1 percent) were females. UBOS calculated the population growth rate of the town to average 2.7 percent annually, between 2015 and 2020.

See also
 List of cities and towns in Uganda
 Rwekunye–Apac–Aduku–Lira–Kitgum–Musingo Road

References

Populated places in Uganda
Cities in the Great Rift Valley
Populated places on the Nile
Kiryandongo District
Bunyoro sub-region